A Different Journey is an album by drummer and bandleader Chico Hamilton recorded in 1963 and released on the Reprise label.

Reception

The Allmusic review by Scott Yanow states: 

On All About Jazz David Rickert wrote:

Track listing
All compositions by Charles Lloyd
 "Sun Yen Yen"  - 5:58
 "Voice in the Night" - 6:55
 "A Different Journey" - 7:53
 "The Vulture" - 4:14
 "One Sheridan Square" - 15:06
 "Island Blues" - 1:43

Personnel
Chico Hamilton - drums
George Bohanon - trombone
Charles Lloyd - tenor saxophone, flute
Gábor Szabó - guitar
Albert Stinson - bass

References

Sources

1963 albums
Chico Hamilton albums
Reprise Records albums